Hector Og Maclean, or Eachann Óg Maclean in Scottish Gaelic, or Hector Maclean the Younger (c. 1540–1573) was the 13th Chief of Clan MacLean. At the death of his father, Hector Mor Maclean, 12th Chief, he became clan chief but lived only five years longer than his father.

Early years
He was born around 1540. At the death of his father, Hector Mor Maclean, 12th Chief, Hector Og became clan chief.

During which short period he not only spent, by his improvident conduct and profligacy, all the money left by the late noble chief, but burdened the estates with debt. He appears to have inherited nothing of the qualities which distinguished his father, but lived at peace in the free enjoyment of his pleasures. He was the only worthless chief of MacLean. He appears to have built for himself a residence at Iona, situated near the head of Port-a-Churraich, where traces of the house are extant.

Marriage and children
Hector Og Maclean married Janet Campbell, daughter of the Archibald Campbell, 4th Earl of Argyll, in the year 1557 and had the following children:
Sir Lachlan Mor Maclean, his heir and successor
Mary Maclean, married to Angus MacDonald, 8th of Dunnyveg
Janet Maclean, married to Roderick MacLeod of Lewis
Marian Maclean, married to Hector Roy Maclean, 5th Laird of Coll

Death
Hector died during the latter part of 1573, or the beginning of 1574.

References

1573 deaths
Hector Og
Year of birth uncertain